I'm in Your Mind Fuzz is the fifth studio album by Australian psychedelic rock band King Gizzard & the Lizard Wizard. It was released on 31 October 2014 on Flightless Records in Australia, just over a week later on 11 November in the United States on Castle Face Records, and on 1 December that same year on Heavenly Records worldwide. At the J Awards of 2014, the album was nominated for Australian Album of the Year. I'm in Your Mind Fuzz was the band's first album to chart on the ARIA charts, peaking at number 85.

Background 
I'm in Your Mind Fuzz was King Gizzard's first release with Heavenly Records and Castle Face Records, serving as their worldwide debut as prior albums had only been released domestically by Flightless at that point. The band released the track "Cellophane" on SoundCloud as the lead single on 14 September 2014, followed by a 3D music video for the song two days later. On 6 November, a week after the album had released in Australia, the band released a music video for the song "Satan Speeds Up".

Music 
The album has been described as psychedelic rock and garage rock.

Track listing 
Vinyl releases have tracks 1–6 on Side A, and tracks 7–10 on Side B.

Personnel 
Credits for I'm in Your Mind Fuzz adapted from liner notes.

King Gizzard & the Lizard Wizard
 Michael Cavanagh – drums
 Cook Craig – guitars
 Ambrose Kenny-Smith – blues harp
 Stu Mackenzie – vocals, guitars, keys, flute
 Eric Moore – drums
 Lucas Skinner – bass
 Joey Walker – guitars, vocals

Production
 Stu Mackenzie – production, additional recording, mixing (tracks 2, 5, 6, 8–10), additional mixing (tracks 1, 3, 4, 7)
 Wayne Gordon – recording (tracks 1, 3, 4, 6, 7)
 Paul Maybury – recording (tracks 2, 5, 8–10), mixing (tracks 2, 8, 10)
 Michael Badger – mixing (tracks 1, 3, 4, 7)
 Joe Carra – mastering
 Jason Galea – art (recreation of art by Louis Saekow)

References

External links
 

2014 albums
King Gizzard & the Lizard Wizard albums
Heavenly Recordings albums
Flightless (record label) albums
Garage rock albums by Australian artists